Lawes is a rural locality in the Lockyer Valley Region, Queensland, Australia. In the  Lawes had a population of 328 people.

Geography
Lawes is located on the eastern outskirts of the town of Gatton. The Warrego Highway passes from east to west through the northern part of the locality. The Main Line railway passes through the locality from east to west. Lawes railway station served the locality but is now abandoned.

History

Lawes takes its name from the Lawes railway station, which in turn was named in 1936 (previously known as College Siding because of the adjacent Queensland Agricultural College). The Lawes name was proposed by the college principal, John K. Murray, in honour of Sir John Bennett Lawes, who was a scientist and founder of Rothamsted Experimental Station in Hertfordshire, England and promoted the use of artificial fertilizers and particularly superphosphate.

In the  Lawes had a population of 304 people.

In the  Lawes had a population of 328 people.

Facilities
The heritage-listed University of Queensland Gatton Campus is located at Lawes.

References

Localities in Queensland
Lockyer Valley Region